Huddersfield Town's 1929–30 campaign was a season that saw Town reach their 4th FA Cup Final in 10 years. They finished in 10th place in Clem Stephenson's first season in charge.

Squad at the start of the season

Review
Following the disappointing 16th-place finish the previous season, Jack Chaplin stepped down from the manager's hotseat to be the assistant to the recently retired Town legend Clem Stephenson. The season produced mixed results which varied from a 4-1 win over eventual champions Sheffield Wednesday to the massive 7-1 defeat to Bolton Wanderers on New Year's Day 1930.

The season is most noted for the team's FA Cup run, which saw the team reach their 4th final, mainly thanks to the 9 cup goals scored by Alex Jackson. Unfortunately, the final was against an Arsenal side led by Town's managerial legend Herbert Chapman. The Gunners beat the Terriers 2-0 at Wembley to win their first ever title. That wouldn't be the last title they would win under Chapman.

Squad at the end of the season

Results

Division One

FA Cup

Appearances and goals

Huddersfield Town A.F.C. seasons
Huddersfield Town F.C.